Elizabeth White (born 11 August 1979) is an English actress. She is known for portraying roles of Annie Cartwright in the BBC One drama series Life on Mars (2006–2007), and Emma Keane in the Channel 4 school-based drama series Ackley Bridge (2017–2019).

Television and theatre
White's other prominent TV roles were in series 1 of the ITV drama The Fixer, playing Jess Mercer, the sister of John Mercer. She also played Shannon in The Empresses' New Clothes, an episode of Fairy Tales, which were the BBC's modern takes on classic children's stories. In April 2011, she appeared in the BBC adaptation The Crimson Petal and the White.

She featured in the music video for Bush's final single "Inflatable", and starred in the Hammer Films 2012 adaptation of The Woman in Black as the eponymous woman. In July 2014, White starred as Melissa in episodes 1 and 2 of the original audio drama 'Osiris' by Everybodyelse Productions, and in 2014 as Lizzie Mottershead in BBC One's Our Zoo, a drama series about the man who created Chester Zoo and the effect it had on his family.

On stage, she starred in the lead role of Heavenly Critchfield in Tennessee Williams' Spring Storm at the National Theatre in London in 2010, transferred from The Royal & Derngate Northampton production where it premiered in 2009. In 2011, she appeared in A Woman Killed with Kindness by Thomas Heywood at the Lyttelton at the National Theatre in 2011, where she appeared in 2013 again in a double role in Simon Stephens' play Port. 
In October 2014, she appeared as Chrysothemis in Electra by Sophocles opposite Kristin Scott Thomas at the Old Vic Theatre in London, which also starred Peter Wight who played her father-in-law in the BBC series Our Zoo.

In 2017, it was announced that White would appear in a revival of Jim Cartwright's play Road at the Royal Court Theatre Later that year, she began appearing in the Channel 4 drama series Ackley Bridge as Emma Keane, a role she portrayed until 2019.

In 2019, White portrayed Joy Davidman at the Chichester Festival Theatre's production of Shadowlands, along with National Youth Theatre actors Hugh Bonneville and Andrew Havill.

Filmography

References

External links
 
 Liz White at bbc.co.uk's official Life on Mars website, with an interview and career overview.

1979 births
Living people
English television actresses
English film actresses
Actors from Rotherham
Actresses from Yorkshire
Alumni of the Liverpool Institute for Performing Arts